Eddie Stobart: Trucks & Trailers is a documentary television programme series exploring the world of the Eddie Stobart haulage company.  The first broadcast of each episode is on Channel 5 on Friday evenings at 8 pm.

About the show
Eddie Stobart: Trucks & Trailers features some of the day-to-day activities of the Stobart Group, the UK logistics company, with a particular focus on its Eddie Stobart road haulage division.

This highly popular observational documentary featuring haulage firm Eddie Stobart shows Stobart's Haulage, Rail and Air divisions. The programme joins the drivers as they take on the challenges of delivering everything from the new pitch at Cardiff's Millennium Stadium, to a London Landmark – the famous Piccadilly lights. The show is sometimes viewed as 'sensationalist' due to its dramatic narration style. The series also meets a new breed of drivers, as 20 young lads compete to win a place on the firm's coveted apprenticeship scheme.

The first four series saw the programme reach the top 10 of watched programmes for Channel 5, with the final two episodes of Series 2 taking first and second places for the week ending 3 July 2011.

A seventh series titled Eddie Stobart's Excellent Adventures shows a selection of memorable journeys from the previous series.

Series overview

Episodes

Series 1 (2010)

Series 2 (2011)

2011 Christmas Special

Series 3 (2012)

Series 4 (2012)

2012 Christmas Special

Series 5 (2013)

Series 6 (2013)
This series is also known as Stobart: Trucks, Trains and Planes.

2013 Christmas Special

Series 7 (2014)
This series is also known as Eddie Stobart's Excellent Adventures.

Notes:
 First Broadcast Date are for showings on Channel 5 (United Kingdom)
 Viewer numbers are the combined numbers of those watching on television the 8pm airing on Channel 5, Channel 5 HD, and the 9pm airing on Channel 5+1 for the First Broadcast date only.
 Airings on later days, and those watched by using other catchup services such as Five On Demand and Sky Plus are not included.
 Numbers in brackets [4] indicate the programme's position of watched programmes on Channel 5 in the same week

References

External links
 

2010 British television series debuts
2014 British television series endings
2010s British documentary television series
Channel 5 (British TV channel) original programming
English-language television shows
Television series by Endemol